The Fort Worth WCT was a men's tennis tournament played in Fort Worth, Texas from 1975 to 1976.  The event was part of the WCT Tour and was held on outdoor hard courts.

Finals

Singles

Doubles

External links
 ATP World Tour archive

World Championship Tennis
Defunct tennis tournaments in the United States
Tennis tournaments in Texas
Recurring sporting events established in 1975
Recurring sporting events disestablished in 1976
1975 establishments in Texas
1976 disestablishments in Texas
Sports in Fort Worth, Texas